= Miles Scientific =

Manufacturing firm in the United States

Miles Scientific (also known as iChromatography, previously known as Analtech) is a manufacturing firm based in Newark, Delaware. It produces thin-layer chromatography plates and accessories.

The firm was started as Custom Service Chemicals in 1961 by four men. Custom Service Chemicals changed its name to Analtech, a shortening of analytical technologies, on January 1, 1965. Its facility, located in Wilmington industrial park, was destroyed in a fire on May 29, 1965. The company relocated and was able to open its new facility in two weeks. In 1970, the firm moved out of its leased space and into a new facility in Blue Hen Industrial Park.

In 2008, the firm had 20 employees.

In August 2015, the firm was purchased by its general manager, Steven Miles, from the estates of two of its founders. At this time, it had 13 employees. The company subsequently rebranded as Miles Scientific.
